Queen for Seven Days is a South Korean television series starring Park Min-young as the titular Queen Dangyeong, with Yeon Woo-jin and Lee Dong-gun. It aired on KBS2 every Wednesday and Thursday at 22:00 (KST) from May 31, 2017 to August 3, 2017.

Cast

Main
Park Min-young as Shin Chae-kyung, later known as Queen Dangyeong

Park Si-eun as young Shin Chae-kyung
Yeon Woo-jin as Lee Yeok, Grand Prince Jinseong/Nak-chun, later King Jungjong

Baek Su-ho as young Lee Yeok
Choi Jung-hoo as child Lee Yeok
Lee Dong-gun as Crown Prince Lee Yung, King Yeonsangun
Ahn Do-gyu as young Crown Prince Lee Yung
Lee Seung-woo as child Crown Prince Lee Yung

Supporting

Royal family
Do Ji-won as Queen Dowager Jasun, Lee Yeok's mother

Song Ji-in as Queen Shin, Lee Yung's primary wife and Chae-kyung's paternal aunt
Son Eun-seo as Jang Nok-su, Royal Consort Suk-yong of the Heungdeok Jang clan. Lee Yung's most favored concubine as well as confidante.

Ministers
Jang Hyun-sung as Shin Soo-geun, Queen Shin's older brother and Chae-kyung's father
Kang Shin-il as Im Sa-hong, Lee Yung's close confidant
Park Won-sang as Park Won-jong, Myung-hye's maternal uncle
Yoo Hyung-kwan as Yoo Soon-jung
Yoo Seung-bong as Yoo Ja-kwang
Lee Hwa-ryong as Sung Hee-an

Extended
Kang Ki-young as Jo Kwang-oh, Lee Yeok's friend
Jung Yoo-ahn as young Jo Kwang-oh
Kim Min-ho as Baek Suk-hee, Lee Yeok's friend
Jo Byeong-kyu as young Baek Suk-hee
Hwang Chan-sung as Seo Noh, Lee Yeok's personal bodyguard and friend
Choi Min-young as young Seo Noh
Go Bo-gyeol as Yoon Myung-hye, Park Won-jong's maternal niece and later known as Queen Jangkyung 
Park Seo-yeon as young Yoon Myung-hye
Kim Jung-young as Madam Kwon, Shin Soo-geun's wife and Chae-kyung's mother

Yeom Hye-ran as Chae-kyung's nursemaid
Yoo Min-kyu as Ki Ryong, Lee Yung's personal bodyguard
Choi Seung-kyung as Eunuch Kim
Park Yong-jin as Eunuch Song
Kim Ki-chun as Mak Gae, Seo Noh's father; a former clerk-on-duty during King Seongjong's dying moments
Yoon In-jo as Court Lady Choi, the Dowager Queen's lady-in-waiting

Cameo
Kim Jung-hak as King Seongjong, the previous King (flashbacks)
Woo Hee-jin as Deposed Queen Yoon, Yeonsangun's biological mother (flashback)

Lee Jae-woo as a Royal Commander
Jin Hyun-kwang as a Gatekeeper
Park Jae-keun as an escort warrior
Yoon Jong-won as Dae Myung
Heo Sung-tae as a Shaman
Kim Young-sun
Song Kyung-hwa
Im Jung-ok
Jeon Sung-il
Choi Hee-do

Production 
In March 2017, it was announced that Park Min-young will be re-teaming with director Lee Jung-sub on Queen for Seven Days. They previously worked together on Glory Jane (2011) and Healer (2014-15). It is the first production of Monster Union, the independent content company set up by KBS in July 2016.

The drama's first script reading took place on April 7, 2017 in Yeouido, Seoul.

Prior to broadcast, lead actress Park stated that the audience could think of the drama "as Love in the Moonlight five years later," pertaining to KBS2's popular historical series starring Park Bo-gum and Kim Yoo-jung.

Original soundtrack

Part 1

Part 2

Part 3

Part 4

Part 5

Ratings
 In the table below, the blue numbers represent the lowest ratings and the red numbers represent the highest ratings.
 NR denotes that the drama did not rank in the top 20 daily programs on that date.

Awards and nominations

International Broadcast
 In aired starting November 23, 2017 on Now Drama Channel and FTA Live, and on ViuTV on March 27, 2018.
 In Sri Lanka, the drama is available to stream on-demand via Iflix with Sinhalese and English subtitles. It is also available to stream on-demand via the My Galaxy app on Samsung smartphones.
 In Turkey, it was aired on Kanal 7 and dubbed in Turkish known as Ömre Bedel.

References

External links 
  
 
 

Korean-language television shows
2017 South Korean television series debuts
2017 South Korean television series endings
Korean Broadcasting System television dramas
South Korean historical television series
Television series set in the Joseon dynasty
Television series by Monster Union